Canmore Museum and Geoscience Centre (CMAGS) is the public name used by the Centennial Museum Society of Canmore. 'Canmore Museum and Geoscience Centre' is the name used by the Centennial Museum Society of Canmore. The Society was incorporated in 1984 under The Societies Act of the Province of Alberta. The society is also a registered charity. In June 2004, the museum moved from its original location to a new purpose built space in the Canmore Civic Centre. Spanning generations, cultures and social classes, the museum presents over 120 years worth of local history.

Affiliations
The Museum is affiliated with: CMA, CHIN, and Virtual Museum of Canada. The Canmore Museum and Geoscience Centre is a member of the Canadian Museums Association, an organization that represents nearly 2000 museums. Each year, more than 55 million visitors attend Canadian museums. In turn, these institutions employ over 10,000 full-time, around 10,000 part-time employees and are supported by more than 40,000 volunteers. In addition, it is a member of the Alberta Museums Association.

Recognition
The Canmore Museum became one of the museums in the province of Alberta to receive the Recognized Museum designation from the Alberta Museums Association. To earn this designation, the museum provided a panel of museum professionals with evidence achieving internationally recognized criteria of a museum.

This designation is achieved by participating in the Museum Affirmation Program, a new initiative designed to strengthen the Association's accountability toward the public funds it distributes through grants and programming to the province's museums.

As a Recognized Museum, the Canmore Museum has met the internationally recognized definition and standards of a museum. This status is good for 5 years (until 2012), at which point the designation will be revisited.

Programs
Programming is an important component of the overall mandate of the organization. Events such as the annual Rock and Fossil Clinic have become an important part of science outreach activities in the Canmore area. This show put on with the cooperation and support of organizations such as the Burgess Shale Foundation.

In cooperation with Burgess Shale Foundations, CMAGS has run yearly trips to the Mount Stephen trilobite beds and to the Walcott Quarry. Tours have also previously visited the Columbia Icefield Visitors' Centre and the Royal Tyrrell Museum of Palaeontology.

Tours of Canmore's mining history are led by Gerry Stephenson, former Chief Engineer of the Canmore mines, approximately twice a month during the summer. They are very entertaining and popular with locals and tourists alike.

The museum also runs school and summer programs for children of various ages as part of its education mandate.

History
The museum started from a school assignment in 1936. Teacher Edna Appleby gave the students an assignment to write a letter to a foreign country requesting a doll in ethnic dress. One of the students, Mavis Mallabone, continued to collect dolls from all over the world. This significant collection was on display at the original museum until the mid-1990s. The museum as steward of the town's history has a collection of artifacts from early mining history to the 1988 Winter Olympics and beyond.

After the mine closed in 1979, some expected that the town would soon follow the likes of nearby Georgetown, Anthracite and Bankhead and become a ghost town or vanish like the work in the coal mine. Instead, within a few years, Canmore was the site of the Nordic Centre for the 1988 Winter Olympics. The resulting development through the 1990s, and beyond have led to a mountain community with year round tourism as a sought after vacation destination and a major real estate market in recreational property. History buffs have no shortage of places to visit in the town of Canmore including the 19th Century North-West Mounted Police Barracks hosted by the Canmore Museum and Geoscience Centre. In addition, the miner's favourite hang-out, the Canmore Hotel, the original Miner's Union Hall, is still a multi-use facility which will be the cornerstone of the new Lamphouse Theatre project.

Exhibits

From Coal to Community 
This new exhibit officially opened on March 4, 2016. It features coal mining artifacts from the Canmore Mining Industry. It is not just a museum of coal mining history however, but has a mandate to tell the stories of the heritage of the town and the people of the mountains. There are displays of rocks and fossils from the Canadian Rocky Mountains.

This museum is kid-friendly. There are multiple interactive stations, including one with a microscope.

The museum produced multi-media shows which study the changes in the community over time. Interviews were grouped into three main aspects: blessings, challenges and history. There was a wide range of ideas and issues considered when looking at the positives and negatives of a growing community.

David Thompson Bicentennial 
In 2008, the Canmore Museum and Geoscience Centre organized a traveling exhibition in celebration of the David Thompson Bicentennial (2007–2011). The exhibit was designed to create an awareness of how Thompson's efforts gave shape and definition to the northwest half of North America. The environment and aboriginal world inhabited by Thompson is also explored in the exhibition. The exhibit called 'David Thompson: 200 Years Later' travelled to other museums and historic sites beginning in 2009.

Events 
The Canmore Museum hosts many presentations and evening talks showcasing local authors, history, heritage, geoscience and other areas of interest. The museum society has fought to save heritage sites in the Canmore area such as the Canmore Hotel. The museum welcomes feedback regarding the town's definition of heritage and history.

Miner's Day 
Miner's Day is an annual event held on the Saturday closest to July 13. It occurs in commemoration of the 92 years of continuous operation, the last shift in the Canmore coal mines was on July 13, 1979 from 8 AM to 4 PM.) This date was chosen in commemoration of the last shift in the Canmore coal mines on July 13, 1979 from 8 AM to 4 PM. Surviving miners and their families walk in a parade of the miner's families along Main Street followed by a BBQ organized by Canmore Museum.

Publications
The first publication by the Canmore Museum & Geoscience Centre is 'Survival in Paradise: A Century of Coal Mining in the Bow Valley'. The book was written by Walter J. Riva, a former mine engineer and manager at the Canmore Mines Ltd. and member of the Canadian Mining Hall of Fame, with editing and layout design by Rob Alexander. This important book tells the story of coal mining in the Bow Valley, including Anthracite, Bankhead, Georgetown and Canmore.

References

External links
 

1984 establishments in Canada
Canmore, Alberta
History museums in Alberta
Mining museums in Canada
Museums in Alberta